Hubstaff is a remote company that created a workforce management software suite that offers proof of work, time-tracking software, and payroll management, along with a remote talent finder and project management software. Founded in 2012 by Dave Nevogt and Jared Brown, today Hubstaff employs a workforce of more than 90 people across the world.

The company values freedom, transparency, customers-first approach, accountability, and attentional control.

Hubstaff was seen as a rising technology company in 2015, when they received a nomination as part of Techpoint’s Mira Awards for The Best of Tech in Indiana. The company also made the Inc. 5000 list in 2018 and 2019.

History
Dave Nevogt and Jared Brown founded Hubstaff after they began to hire freelancers and wanted a better way to manage them. Nevogt was previously the founder of McCordsville-based Innovative Solutions Inc., while Brown had a background as a developer.

Following the creation of the software with the same name as the company, the outsourcing of freelance work became more common with the development of sites such as Elance and oDesk. Hubstaff considered that the use of their software allowed for entrepreneurs and startup companies to focus on the strategic side of the business, rather than operational tasks. The use of freelance management software became more frequent as web-based startups began to outsource the majority of their operational teams.

In 2014, the company appeared in the Huffington Post as a commentator when looking for red flags when recruiting on LinkedIn. The analysis carried out by Hubstaff included spotting spelling or grammatical mistakes, as it can demonstrate a sloppy attitude towards detail and communication.

Hubstaff were nominees for the Best Tech in Indiana Award in the best Tech Startup of the Year category in 2015.

In April 2020, an article was published on The Wall Street Journal website, discussing how companies were seeing increases in productivity while using the software developed by Hubstaff.

In May 2020, Hubstaff's co-founder Jared Brown appeared on NBC's The Today Show and talked about the role of software developed by the company in supporting businesses in the shift to remote work during the COVID-19 pandemic.

References

External links
 
Companies based in Indianapolis
Software companies based in Indiana
Remote companies
Software companies established in 2012
American companies established in 2012
2012 establishments in Indiana